The 1946–47 Allsvenskan was the 13th season of the top division of Swedish handball. 10 teams competed in the league. Redbergslids IK won the league, but the title of Swedish Champions was awarded to the winner of Svenska mästerskapet. SoIK Hellas and IK Göta were relegated.

League table

Attendance

References 

Swedish handball competitions